The Boval Hut is a refuge in the Alps in Switzerland. It lies at the foot of Piz Morteratsch and Piz Bernina, above the Morteratsch Glacier.

Mountain huts in the Alps
Mountain huts in Switzerland
Switzerland geography articles needing translation from French Wikipedia
Pontresina